Gerome is an American masculine given name. The spelling Gérôme is also occasionally found for Jérôme in France, both as a surname and first name.

 Gerome Kamrowski (1914–2004), American artist
 Gerome Ragni (1935–1991), American actor, singer and songwriter
 Gerome Sapp (born 1981), American football safety
 Jean Leon Gerome Ferris (1863–1930), American artist

See also 
 Gerome (disambiguation)